Roland Orlando James (born February 18, 1958) is a former American college and professional football player who was a defensive back in the National Football League (NFL) for eleven seasons during the 1980s and early 1990s.  James played college football for the University of Tennessee, and was recognized as an All-American.  He was selected in the first round of the 1980 NFL Draft, and played for the NFL's New England Patriots for his entire professional career.

College career
James attended the University of Tennessee, and played for the Tennessee Volunteers football team from 1976 to 1979.  As of 2011, James has the fourth longest punt return in the history of the University of Tennessee, an 89-yard return against Vanderbilt in 1979.  While at Tennessee, Roland played in three bowl games: the Hula, Senior and Bluebonnet bowls.

Professional career

James had the longest punt return in the NFL during the 1980 season.  He returned a punt 75 yards for a TD in the Patriots 34–21 win over the New York Jets at Schaefer Stadium on November 2.  James recorded five sacks in 1981.

He intercepted a pass by David Woodley on the last play of the Patriots 3-0 "Snow Plow" victory over the Miami Dolphins on December 12, 1982.

James intercepted three passes by Joe Ferguson in the third quarter of the Patriots 31–0 shutout of the Buffalo Bills at Rich Stadium on 10-23-83, becoming the first player in club history to record three interceptions in the same quarter.

He tackled Frank Middleton for a safety in the Patriots 50–17 rout of the Indianapolis Colts on November 18, 1984.

James recovered 10 fumbles during the regular season and recovered a fumble by Freeman McNeil in the Patriots 26-14 AFC Playoff Game win over the NY Jets on December 28, 1985.

He had 29 interceptions and 42 punt returns in 145 regular season games for the New England Patriots.

James played in five playoff games for the New England Patriots.

Post-playing career
James went on to coach the Sharon High School football team in Sharon, Massachusetts.  His son, Roland James Jr., played for Hofstra.  His son, Roman, played free safety at Baylor University. He currently resides in Sharon, Massachusetts and is working as the Director of Youth Services at the Somerville Community Youth Program in Somerville, Massachusetts, and is active in other charitable work.

References

1958 births
Living people
American football cornerbacks
American football safeties
New England Patriots players
All-American college football players
Tennessee Volunteers football players
High school football coaches in Massachusetts
People from Jamestown, Ohio
Sportspeople from Xenia, Ohio
Players of American football from Ohio